The UCPH School of Pharmaceutical Sciences is part of the Faculty of Health and Medical Sciences at University of Copenhagen (UCPH). It is located at the university's North Campus on the border between Nørrebro and Østerbro. The school is organized in two departments.

History
The Pharmaceutical College was founded in 1892 by the chemist Christian D.A. Hansen. The first professor was appointed in 1936, the dr.pharm. degree was introduced in 1942 and the lic.pharm. degree was introduced in 1945. The school was originally located in Stockholmsgade (No. 28) but outgrew its premises in the late 1930s. In 1942, the Pharmaceutical College relocated to its current building in the University Park and changed its name to the Danish Pharmaceutical College (Danmarks Farmaceutiske Højskole). Its name was changed to Danmarks Farmaceutiske Universitet (DFU) in 2003.

On 1 January 2007, DFU was merged into the University of Copenhagen and was renamed as the Faculty of Pharmaceutical Sciences (Farmaceutiske Fakultet, abbr. FARMA). Its current name was introduced in 2012 when it became a school under the Faculty of Health and Medical Sciences.

Building
The school is located at Universitetsparken 2. Its building from 1942 was designed by Kaj Gottlob. The school was expanded with a new Pharma Science Building designed by Cf. Møller Architects in 2015. The four-storey building has a total floor area of 5,130 and contains new laboratories. It is joined to existing buildings by a tall, glazed atrium to the north and to by an indoor walkway to the south. It is clad with tombac panels in a rhomboid pattern on three sides.

Programmes
 MSc programmes
 BSc and MSc programmes in Danish
 Continuing and professional education - part-time master programmes
In Danish
 Bachelor of Science (BSc) – 3-year programme in Danish
 Master of Science (MSc) – 2-year programme in Danish

Drug Research Academy (DRA)
The Drug Research Academy  is a graduate programme in pharmaceutical sciences under the Graduate School of Health and Medical Sciences

In English
MSc programmes
 Medicinal Chemistry
 Pharmaceutical Sciences

Library
The school has its own library, UCPH Pharmaceutical Sciences Library, which holds a collection of new and old books, magazines and provides access to numerous databases. The library is part of the CULIS collaboration between the Royal Library and the libraries at the University of Copenhagen).

See also
 Pharmakon—Danish College of Pharmacy Practice

References

External links
 

University of Copenhagen
Pharmacy schools